Menelaos Psarrakis (born 1910, date of death unknown) was a Greek fencer. He competed in the team foil and the individual and team sabre events at the 1936 Summer Olympics.

References

1910 births
Year of death missing
Greek male fencers
Olympic fencers of Greece
Fencers at the 1936 Summer Olympics